Cheshmeh Ala is a mineral spring located about 4 km north of the city of Damavand, Iran.

References
Geographical Names
Ketab-e-Avval

Architecture in Iran
Springs of Iran
Landforms of Tehran Province